Sean F. Logan (born May 26, 1970, Pitcairn, Pennsylvania) is a Democratic politician and former member of the Pennsylvania State Senate who represented the 45th District from 2001 until his resignation on August 24, 2010, to accept a job at the University of Pittsburgh Medical Center.

References

External links

Follow the Money - Sean Logan
2006 2004 2002 2000 campaign contributions

1970 births
Living people
People from Pitcairn, Pennsylvania
Democratic Party Pennsylvania state senators
People from Monroeville, Pennsylvania